Hugo Alnefelt (born 4 June 2001) is a Swedish professional ice hockey goaltender. He currently plays for the Syracuse Crunch of the American Hockey League (AHL) as a prospect to the Tampa Bay Lightning of the National Hockey League (NHL). Alnefelt was drafted by the Tampa Bay Lightning in the 2019 NHL Entry Draft with the 71st overall selection.

Playing career
Alnefelt was drafted in the third round, 71st overall, of the 2019 NHL Entry Draft by the Tampa Bay Lightning. This pick was initially acquired from the Vancouver Canucks as a part of the J. T. Miller trade. On 1 May 2021, the Tampa Bay Lightning signed Alnefelt to a three-year, entry-level contract.

With both of the Lightning’s regular goalies, starter Andrei Vasilevskiy and backup Brian Elliott out sick due to Covid, the Lightning recalled Alnefelt and fellow goalie Maxime Lagacé from Syracuse on December 27, 2021. Lagacé, with prior NHL experience, played for the Lightning the next day against the Montreal Canadiens in a 5–4 overtime Lightning win. Lagacé started again on December 30 against the Florida Panthers, but was pulled after the second period, letting in 6 goals on 27 shots. Alnefelt made his NHL debut, playing the third period in relief. Alnefelt allowed 3 goals on 10 shots, as the Lightning lost 9–3.
Following the game, RotoWire Staff analyzed Alnefelt as “a decent prospect, but he clearly needs more development time in the AHL.”

Alnefelt was named AHL Player of the Week for the period ending January 29, 2023 after posting a 0.50 goals-against average and a .988 save percentage, including recording a 51-save shutout against the Providence Bruins on January 29, 2023.

Career statistics

Regular season and playoffs

International

References

External links
 

2001 births
Living people
HV71 players
Orlando Solar Bears (ECHL) players
People from Danderyd Municipality
Swedish ice hockey goaltenders
Syracuse Crunch players
Tampa Bay Lightning draft picks
Tampa Bay Lightning players
Sportspeople from Stockholm County